Ezaa or Ezza is a northeastern Igbo sub-group, in Ebonyi State, southeastern Nigeria. The Ezaa are direct descendants of Ezekuna, and his wife, Anyigo. They are therefore, often referred to as Ezaa Ezekuna. The group is found at the north of Afikpo.

References

Igbo subgroups